City of Detroit III, often referred to as just D-III, was a sidewheel steamer on the Detroit River and Lake Erie. She was one of the largest sidewheelers on the Great Lakes.

History 
City of Detroit III was built by the Detroit Shipbuilding Company in Wyandotte, Michigan and was designed by Frank E. Kirby.  The interior decorations were designed by painter and architect Louis O. Keil, who collaborated with Kirby on many projects. It was owned by the Detroit and Cleveland Navigation Company (D&C) and was launched on October 7, 1911. When she was launched City of Detroit III was the largest sidewheeler in the world. The next year the slightly larger  length overall Seeandbee, another Kirby designed ship, was launched for the Cleveland & Buffalo Transit Company (C&B). City of Detroit III traveled regularly between Detroit, Michigan, Cleveland, Ohio and Buffalo, New York.

The "Gothic Room" 

City of Detroit III cost $1,500,000 to build ($ in  dollars) and was ornately furnished. Forty percent of the steamer's width was situated over the wheels, allowing room for many amenities like salons, a palm court and a winery to be built into the vessel. One of the rooms was an opulent smoking room called the "Gothic Room", named for its Gothic design. It was built from English oak and included a stained glass window.

End of service 
City of Detroit III was taken out service in 1950, when the D&C discontinued service. She was  sold for scrap in 1956, and was dismantled. City of Detroit IIIs "Gothic Room" was disassembled and re-erected in a barn near Cleveland, Ohio, for ten years before it was once again taken down and then partially reassembled and refinished at the Dossin Great Lakes Museum on Belle Isle in Detroit.

References

Bibliography

Further reading 

 

History of Detroit
Great Lakes ships
Ships built in Wyandotte, Michigan
Paddle steamers
1911 ships
Passenger ships of the United States
Detroit and Cleveland Navigation Company